The Slovak Wikipedia is the edition of Wikipedia in Slovak. It was started on before 23 September 2003, only becoming active in the summer of 2004. It cleared the 15,000-article mark in September 2005 and the 50,000-article mark in August 2006 and the 100,000 article mark in August 2008. The Slovak Wikipedia has over 170,000 articles as of 28 March 2012. It cleared the 200,000-article mark on 5 February 2015. The Slovak Wikipedia is among the largest Slavic-language Wikipedia editions. There are many short bot-generated articles in the Slovak Wikipedia.

Gallery

See also
 Czech Wikipedia

References

External links 

  Slovak Wikipedia
  Slovak Wikipedia mobile version (homepage not yet configured)

Wikipedias by language
Slovak-language websites
Internet properties established in 2003
Slovak encyclopedias